Zagadkogobius ourlazon is a species of fish in the family Microdesmidae native to the deep-water of southwestern South China Sea. This species is the only member of its genus.

References

Marine fish genera
Microdesmidae
Monotypic fish genera
Taxa named by Artem Mikhailovich Prokofiev
Fish described in 2017